Black Legion may refer to:

Black Legion (film), a 1937 American crime drama
Black Legion (political movement), a 1930s Ku Klux Klan splinter group in the United States
Black Legion (Ustaše militia), a 1941 Croatian military unit active during World War II in Yugoslavia
Black Army of Hungary, an army of the Kingdom of Hungary in the 15th century
Black Brunswickers, an army raised in 1809 by Frederick William, Duke of Brunswick and Lüneburg against Napoleon I
Légion Noire, an army of French criminals raised for the last invasion of Britain in 1797
Les Légions Noires, a 1987 French Black Metal movement
The paramilitary unit of the 1968-formed Republic of New Afrika
The Black Legion, an antagonistic faction of Chaos Space Marines in the fictional Warhammer 40,000 setting.

See also
 Black Army (disambiguation)
Legion (disambiguation)
Blackleg (disambiguation)